Coombes Valley RSPB reserve is a nature reserve, run by the RSPB, near the town of Leek in Staffordshire, England. It is best known for its breeding woodland birds, including common redstart, wood warbler and pied flycatcher. It is also home to the nationally scarce argent and sable moth, a priority species in the UK's Biodiversity Action Plan.

The Combes Brook flows through the valley on its way to the River Churnet.

References

Nature reserves in Staffordshire
Royal Society for the Protection of Birds reserves in England
Leek, Staffordshire